The 2017 Coates Hire  Supercars Challenge was a motor racing event for Supercars Championship, held on the weekend of 23 to 26 March 2017. The event was held at the Melbourne Grand Prix Circuit in Melbourne, Victoria, and consisted of four races of 70 kilometres in length. It was a non-championship event, contested by teams taking part in the 2017 Supercars Championship, and was held in support of the 2017 Australian Grand Prix. The event will be the 32nd and final running of the Supercars Challenge, and the last before the event attained championship status for 2018 known as the Melbourne 400.

Report

Background
A new 'rapid-fire' qualifying system was introduced to the event for the 2017 season, with 4 ten minute qualifying sessions held back to back on Thursday afternoon. Taz Douglas was also confirmed to drive again for Lucas Dumbrell Motorsport shortly before the event, after originally only accepting an offer for the previous round, the Clipsal 500.

Practice

See also 
 2017 Supercars Championship
 2017 Australian Grand Prix

References 

Coates Hire V8 Supercars Challenge
Motorsport at Albert Park
March 2017 sports events in Australia